Theodora Mead Abel (1899–1998) was an American clinical psychologist and educator, who used innovative ideas by combining sociology and psychology.  She was a pioneer in cross-cultural psychology.

Early life and education
Theodora was born in Newport, Rhode Island, on September 9, 1899, and raised in New York City.

In 1917, she graduated from Miss Chapin's School, where she was president of the student government.

Abel attended Vassar College and received her B.A. in 1921. In 1924, she received an M.A. from Columbia University, where one of her professors was Leta Stetter Hollingworth. She then attended the University of Paris and obtained her degree in psychology in 1923. Her final degree came from Columbia and was a Ph.D., in 1925.

Career
After receiving her education, Theodora spent time as an educator. She taught at the University of Illinois (1925–1926), Sarah Lawrence College (1929–1933), and the Manhattan Trade School for Girls. 

She then entered the civil world. She worked at the New York State Department of Mental Hygiene from 1940 until 1946, as its chief psychologist. 

In 1947, she took the position of director of psychology at New York City's Post-Graduate Center for Mental Health, a position she held for 24 years.

In 1971, after moving to New Mexico, she became chief of family therapy at the Child Guidance Center, in Albuquerque, where she also established a private practice.  While in New Mexico, she conducted studies of Puebloan peoples.

She wrote many books including:
 The Subnormal Adolescent Girl (1940)
 Facial Disfigurement (1952)
 Psychological Testing in Cultural Contexts (1973)
 Culture and Psychotherapy (1974)

The last of these four books includes an introduction by Margaret Mead, whom Abel had met during graduate school at Columbia.  They became friends after lining up alphabetically (both had the last name "Mead" but they were not related).

Passing
Abel died in Forestburgh, New York, on December 2, 1998.   

Her husband, Theodore Abel, had died in 1988.  They were survived by two daughters Caroline (Abel) Lalire and Zita (Abel) Emerson and a son Peter Abel, plus grandchildren and great-grandchildren.

References

1899 births
1998 deaths
20th-century American academics
20th-century American psychologists
20th-century American women educators
20th-century American educators
20th-century American women scientists
20th-century American women writers
American clinical psychologists
American women psychologists
Chapin School (Manhattan) alumni
Columbia University alumni
Cross-cultural psychology
Educators from New York City
Educators from New Mexico
Educators from Rhode Island
New York State Department of Mental Hygiene
Sarah Lawrence College faculty
Scientists from New Mexico
Scientists from New York City
Scientists from Rhode Island
University of Paris alumni
Vassar College alumni
University of Illinois faculty
Writers from Albuquerque, New Mexico
Writers from New York City
Writers from Newport, Rhode Island